Cooling means: (i) removal of heat, usually resulting in a lower temperature and/or phase change; (ii) lowering temperature:

Cooling (surname), any of several people
"Cooling", a song written and performed by Tori Amos on her 1999 album To Venus and Back
 A nickname of the town of Guling, Jiangxi, China 
 Cooling, Kent, a village in Kent, England